Milan Perič (12 March 1928 – 4 May 1967) was a Czech cyclist. He competed in the individual and team road race events at the 1952 Summer Olympics.

References

External links
 

1928 births
1967 deaths
Czech male cyclists
Czechoslovak male cyclists
Olympic cyclists of Czechoslovakia
Cyclists at the 1952 Summer Olympics
Sportspeople from Prague